Jean Foyer (21 April 1921, Contigné, Maine-et-Loire – 3 October 2008, Paris) was a French politician and minister. He studied law and became a law professor at the university. He wrote several books about French Civil law.

Political career
Between 1962 and 1967, he was Minister of Justice, during this time he directed several important legal reforms on several subjects (family, ownership and business, nationality, etc.).

Between 1972 and 1973, he was Minister of Health.

Between 1959 and 1968, he was a member of the Union for the New Republic, then between 1968 and 1978 he was a member of the Union of Democrats for the Republic and finally from 1978 until 1988 he was a member of the Rally for the Republic.

Jean Foyer was known to be an outspoken defender of a very traditional conception of society and sexual morality, and in 1981, he led a fierce fight against the repeal of Article 331(2) of the Penal Code, an article inherited from the Vichy regime which maintained the age of consent for homosexual relations at eighteen years old (whereas it was fifteen years old for heterosexual relations). During the debate on 20 December 1981, he feared that the repeal of this law would soften the "lecherous old man who sodomizes a fifteen-year-old boy". He also asked: "Is the famous freedom that we are being told is only the right of ogres to devour little thumbs?".

References

Sources
 Sur les chemins du droit avec le Général : mémoires de ma vie politique – 1944–1988, with Sabine Jansen, Fayard, Paris, 2006
 Le nouveau Code de procédure civile, with Catherine Puigelier, Economica, Paris, 2006
 France, qu'ont-ils fait de ta liberté ?, François-Xavier de Guibert, Paris, 1999
 La papauté au XXe siècle (Singer-Polignac Foundation), Cerf, Paris 1999
 La Pensée unique : le vrai procès, with Michel Godet, Jean-Pierre Thiollet, Françoise Thom..., Economica—Jean-Marc Chardon & Denis Lensel Ed., Paris, 1998
 Histoire de la justice, Presses universitaires de France, Paris 1996
 La Ve République, Flammarion, Paris, 1995
 Le député dans la société française, Economica, Paris, 1991
 Titre et armes du prince Louis de Bourbon, Diffusion-Université-Culture, Paris; 1990
 Daumier au Palais de Justice, La Colombe, Paris, 1958
 Procédure civile, with Gérard Cornu, Presses universitaires de France, Paris, 1958 (first ed.)

1921 births
2008 deaths
People from Maine-et-Loire
Union for the New Republic politicians
Union of Democrats for the Republic politicians
Rally for the Republic politicians
French Ministers of Justice
Politicians of the French Fifth Republic
Members of the Académie des sciences morales et politiques
Chevaliers of the Légion d'honneur